Rennzweier (The Double Racer) is a veteran automobile manufactured by Nesselsdorfer Wagenbau-Fabriks-Gesellschaft A.G. (now known as Tatra) in 1900. It is sometimes also called First racing, 12 HP or Rennwagen (The Race Car). It was commissioned by baron Theodor von Liebig. Hans Ledwinka, the man behind the famous rear-engined Tatras, and at the time only 20 years old, took part in constructing the car. The car was manufactured on May 5, 1900, and the manufacturing process took only 5 weeks.

Predecessor racers

In 1899, the NW-cars Wien and Nesselsdorf (descendant models after the Präsident), achieved their first significant racing success on the trotter course in Vienna Prater. It was the first ever race under the Austrian monarchy – starting on October 23, 1899. The driver of the winning NW-car Wien was baron Theodor von Liebig. The other NW-car Nesselsdorf was the second one before all competitors consisting of four Benz-cars and four Dietrich-Bolleé cars. Later, in March 1900, Liebig raced the triangle 192 km track Nizza – Draguignan – Nizza, where he won the second stage outright. Four days later he won the class of four-seaters up to 1000 kg in famous hill climb race Nizza – La Turbié. Based on this achievements, baron Liebig ordered the construction of a new automobile. While the previous cars Liebig used in races were built as common cars, the one he ordered was to be designed as a pure race car.

Design
The construction was unique at the time. The car was very low, especially the driver's seat. There was no bodywork – all mechanical parts were uncovered. Unlike its predecessors, the steering column was slightly tilted.

The car had a modified Benz engine. It was a two-cylinder spark ignition engine with a power output of about 9 kW (12HP) at 1800RPM. It was transversely mounted above the driven rear axle.

The driver was situated on a heightened seat behind the steering wheel, while the passenger seat was much lower on the frame, so the passenger's legs were sticking out under the car.

The gas tank had a volume of 42 liters, while there was also another tank behind the driver for 15 liters of coolant.

The car was able to reach a maximum speed of 82 km/h.

Von Liebig raced the car in numerous contests. He won the La Turbie race that took place in Nice, and took second position in Salzburg-Linz-Vienna race. He later also took part in the Paris-Vienna race.

Today the Rennzweier is exhibited at the Czech National Technical Museum.

A second racing car was made in 1901. This one also made do without bodywork, and this time featured a Hardy engine (flat two, 3188cc, 7,4 kW-8,85 kW (10-12HP)) was used instead of the previous Benz one.

References
 Aleš Dragoun: NW Rennzweier (1900)

External links

 Tatra portal - Web site about TATRA cars and trucks - Magazine articles about NW Rennzweier (Czech)

Cars of the Czech Republic
Tatra vehicles
Rear-wheel-drive vehicles
Rear-engined vehicles
1900s cars
Vehicles introduced in 1900
Sports cars